Vechernyaya Moskva (literally Evening Moscow) is a Russian local newspaper published in Moscow since 6 December 1923 daily (except Saturday and Sunday). It was founded as an organ of the Mossovet, later as an organ of the city committee of the CPSU and the Mossovet. Since 1990 it is published by  the joint-stock company Concern 'Vechernyaya Moskva'.

This is the oldest evening newspaper in Russia, one of the most popular in Moscow with a current circulation of 25,000 copies per day plus 787,000 copies of weekly edition.

In 2011, the project was restarted and developed with the support of the Government of Moscow as a city newspaper of influence covering the major events in the capital, the work of urban services, governance, and the main events in the country and in the world

Editors-in-chief
Volin, Boris Mikhailovich (1923–1924)
Antoshkin, Dmitry Vasilyevich (1925)
Barkov, Vladimir Nikolayevich (1926–1928)
Lazian, Iosif Gerasimovich (1928–1930)
Volodin, Sergey Alekseevich (1930–1931)
Tsypin, Grigory Evgenievich (1931–1932)
Rzhanov, Georgy Alexandrovich (1932–1933)
Romanovsky, Abram Mironovich (1933–1937)
Pozdnov, Mikhail Mikhailovich (1937–1942)
Vasilenko, Vasily Stepanovich (1942–1945)
Fomichev, Andrei Andreevich (1945–1950)
Syrokomsky, Vitaly Aleksandrovich (1963–1966)
Indursky, Semyon Davydovich (1966 – January 1988)
Lisin, Alexander Ivanovich (1988–1998)
Kazarin, Yuri Ivanovich (February 1998 – 2000)
Evseev, Valery Petrovich (2000–2006) 
Brantov, Peter Yurievich (February 3 – May 5, 2006)  
Avyazova, Zhanna Semonovna (2006–2007)
Ryazhsky, Yury Olegovich (2007–2011)
Kupriyanov, Alexander Ivanovich (2011–)

References

External links
 Vechernyaya Moskva - 90 years!
The newspaper Evening Moscow, Russia.
Evening Moscow digital archives in "Newspapers on the web and beyond", the digital resource of the National Library of Russia

Mass media in Moscow
Newspapers published in Russia